N13 may refer to

Roads
 N13 road (Ireland)
 National Route 13 (Morocco)
 Nebraska Highway 13, United States
 Route 13 (Laos)
 Route nationale 13, France

Other uses
 Bloomsburg Municipal Airport, in Pennsylvania, United States
 BMW N13, an automobile engine
 LNER Class N13, a class of British steam locomotives 
 London Buses route N13
 Nissan Pulsar (N13), an automobile
 Nitrogen-13, an isotope of nitrogen
 N13, a postcode district in the N postcode area